Norma Cranko Kitson (18 August 1933 – 12 June 2002) was a South African political activist. She participated in the fight against apartheid in South Africa.

Early life
Norma Belle Cranko was born in Berea, Durban, into a wealthy Jewish family. Her father was a chemist; her mother Millie Stiller Cranko was an immigrant from Poland. Ballet dancer John Cranko was her cousin.

Career
At the age of 14, she went to work as a secretary. She joined the South African Communist Party in the 1950s and became a printer for the cause. After her husband was jailed in 1964, she left South Africa with her children and settled in London, where she set up a women's cooperative press in Gray's Inn Road. She was often to be found protesting apartheid in Trafalgar Square, in front of South Africa House, as part of the City of London Anti-Apartheid Group, which she founded.

After the end of apartheid, the Kitsons were recognized by the African National Congress as veterans of the cause. She was secretary of Zimbabwe Women Writers late in her life, and wrote a creative writing textbook during that time.

Personal life
Norma Cranko married a World War II veteran, mechanical engineer Dave Kitson. They had two children, Stephen and Amandla; they divorced while Dave was serving a long prison sentence. She remarried in 1973, to choreographer Sidney Cherfas, and divorced again; then remarried her first husband after his freedom in 1984. In 1986, she published an autobiography, Where Sixpence Lives.

She moved to Harare, Zimbabwe, after 1994. Norma Kitson died from emphysema in 2002, aged 68 years.

In 2011 she was honoured by the Republic of Sierra Leone by a postage stamp issued for her in their series Legendary Heroes of Africa.

References

Jewish activists
1933 births
2002 deaths
South African activists
South African women activists